Dieter Lindner (born 11 June 1939 in Breslau) is a German former football player.

Lindner played for Eintracht Frankfurt since his youth and remained at his home club the entire career. He appeared in 321 matches in the Oberliga and the new founded Bundesliga. In European fixtures he played 24 times.

In the 1980–81 season, he was vice president for the Eagles and was interim president between May and October 1996. He also was for several years a member of the board of directors.

Lindner is an honoured member and honoured captain of Eintracht Frankfurt.

Honours 
 European Cup: runner-up 1959–60
 UEFA Intertoto Cup: 1966–67
 German championship: 1958–59
 Oberliga Süd: 1958–59; runner-up 1960–61, 1961–62
 DFB-Pokal: runner-up 1963–64

References

External links 
  Dieter Lindner at eintracht-archiv.de 

1939 births
Living people
German footballers
Bundesliga players
Eintracht Frankfurt players
Eintracht Frankfurt presidents
Eintracht Frankfurt non-playing staff
Association football midfielders
West German footballers
Sportspeople from Wrocław
People from the Province of Silesia
Silesian-German people